Murth Mossel (Amsterdam, 6 February 1970), also known as Murth The Man O Script, is a Dutch rapper  and stand-up comedian.

Biography
In the early 1990s Murth did his stand-up routines at Comedytrain and Freshwagon. Being involved in the hiphop-scene for years he collaborated on Extince's 1998 Zoete Inval/Zoute Uitval-single among others; in 1999 he made a cameo-appearance in the video for Def Rhymz' "Doekoe".

During this period Murth was a VJ at TMF hosting The Pitch; his next job was presenting Paradisolife for NOS; a series of package-concerts made up of individual performances and special collaborations (for example, triphop-outfit Lamb teaming up with jazz-crossover group New Cool Collective). Paradisolife was voted Best Music Programme in 2001.

In 2004 he expanded to cartoon-voices; credits include The Thunderbirds.

In 2005 Murth performed his debut-theatre-show Niet Vanzelfsprekend (Don't Take It For Granted) at a joint tour with Roue Verveer whose M.A.W. was the opening part. He also made Comedytrain-trips to countries such as Suriname and China; in 2009 his first full-length solo-show Status Aparte premiered.

In between his Comedytrain-commitments, Murth continued rapping; he released three albums with rap-collective Flinke Namen; their  2009-single Als Zij Langs Loopt became a top 20-hit. Follow-up Wolken, accompanied by a black 'n white-video in which Murth played a cab-driver, stalled in the bubbling-under charts.

He currently tours with his solo-show Eerste Persoonn Enkelvoud.

In 2019 he appeared in the drama film Bloody Marie.

References

Dutch rappers
Dutch male comedians
Dutch people of Surinamese descent
Entertainers from Amsterdam
Living people
1970 births